WETZ  (1330 AM) is a classic hits formatted broadcast radio station licensed to New Martinsville, West Virginia, serving New Martinsville, Western Wetzel County, West Virginia and Eastern Monroe County, Ohio.  WETZ is owned and operated by Dailey Corporation. On the FM dial, WETZ can be heard on 93.1 and 104.5.

On Monday, April 5, 2021, WETZ changed its format from classic hits to classic rock. After nearly a year of running the classic rock format WETZ reverted back to a classic hits station.

External links

ETZ